Zaiful bin Abdul Hakim (born 1 March 1994) is a Malaysian footballer who plays for Malaysia M3 League side Kuala Lumpur Rovers as a left back.

References

External links
 

1994 births
Living people
People from Selangor
Malaysian footballers
Kuala Lumpur City F.C. players
Association football defenders